"Nothing Is Lost (You Give Me Strength)" is a song by Canadian singer the Weeknd. It was released by XO, Hollywood Records and Republic Records on December 15, 2022, as the lead single of the soundtrack for the epic science fiction action-adventure film Avatar: The Way of Water (2022). The song was written by the Weeknd, who composed with production trio Swedish House Mafia, along with the film's score composer, Simon Franglen. Musically, "Nothing Is Lost (You Give Me Strength)" is a "bombastic" ballad, featuring an "anthemic" melody and prominent drums in its chorus, accompanied with occasional tribal chants in the background.

Background and release
On December 4, 2022, the Weeknd posted a teaser of the soundtrack on his social media, hinting at the release date December 16. On December 7, a new trailer for the James Cameron-directed film was released. The trailer itself was titled after the song. It features a prominent snippet of the song with vocals that "softly play throughout the trailer". According to a press release, the song seeks to "speak to the epic scope, breathtaking action, and thrilling drama of the film itself". In interview at the film premiere, the producer Jon Landau told to Complex that “when (the Weeknd) came in, Swedish House Mafia came up with the concept of the song, and they embraced working with our composer, Simon Franglen. And together, they came up with a song that is true to who The Weeknd is but is organic to our film. And that's what was important to us. We didn't want just something to come on at the end of the movie that felt outside of it, but he embraced that collaboration, and his voice, oh my God”.

Composition
The Weeknd self-wrote the lyrics to "Nothing Is Lost (You Give Me Strength)" and composed the song's melody with production trio Swedish House Mafia and Simon Franglen. Since release, the song has been described by music and film critics as a "dramatic" and "bombastic" ballad with a "trance-adjacent beat and pulsing synthesizers" featuring an "anthemic", orchestral melody, and "thundering" drums in its chorus.

Music video
A music video for "Nothing Is Lost (You Give Me Strength)" was released on January 16, 2023. The filming took place in Krabi, Thailand in December 2022. Most of the actors in the music video are Thai.

Charts

Release history

References

External links
 
 
 

2022 singles
2022 songs
The Weeknd songs
Avatar (franchise)
Songs written by the Weeknd
Songs written by Axwell
Songs written by Sebastian Ingrosso
Songs written by Steve Angello
Songs written for films
Hollywood Records singles
Republic Records singles